Aleks Ławniczak (born 5 May 1999) is a Polish professional footballer who plays as a centre-back for Zagłębie Lubin.

Career statistics

Club

References

External links

1999 births
Living people
Footballers from Poznań
Polish footballers
Association football defenders
Miedź Legnica players
Warta Poznań players
Zagłębie Lubin players
Ekstraklasa players
I liga players
III liga players